Chachoengsao Town Municipality Stadium is a multi-purpose stadium in Chachoengsao Province, Thailand. It is currently used mostly for football matches and is the home stadium of Chachoengsao Hi-Tek F.C. The stadium holds 6,000 people.

Football venues in Thailand
Multi-purpose stadiums in Thailand
Buildings and structures in Chachoengsao province